Tazeh Kand-e Yuzbashi (also Romanized as Tāzeh Kand-e Yūzbāshī; also known as Tāzeh Kand) is a village in Meshgin-e Gharbi Rural District, in the Central District of Meshgin Shahr County, Ardabil Province, Iran. At the 2006 census, its population was 24, in 7 families.

References 

Towns and villages in Meshgin Shahr County